The Roberto De Vicenzo Punta del Este Open Copa NEC was a men's professional golf tournament.

First held in 2005 as the Roberto De Vicenzo Classic, it is named after one of Argentina's most successful golfers, Roberto De Vicenzo. The tournament has been held at the San Eliseo Golf Club in Buenos Aires, Argentina until 2012, and moved to the Club de Golf del Uruguay in Montevideo, Uruguay. In 2015, it moved to Club del Lago Golf in Maldonado, Uruguay. All three cities are on the Río de la Plata.

From 2007 to 2011, the tournament was part of the TPG Tour, the official professional golf tour in Argentina. In 2006 and from 2008 to 2010, it was included on the Tour de las Américas schedule. In 2012, it was included on the PGA Tour Latinoamérica schedule. For the 2018 season, it was downgraded to the PGA Tour Latinoamérica Dev Series.

It initially consisted of a pro-am fourball competition over the first two rounds, with just the professionals going on to play in the final two rounds. In 2012, it changed to a 144 player, stroke play tournament.

Winners

Notes

References

External links
Coverage on the PGA Tour Latinoamérica official site

PGA Tour Latinoamérica events
Former Tour de las Américas events
Golf tournaments in Argentina
Golf in Uruguay
Sports competitions in Uruguay
Spring (season) events in Uruguay
Recurring sporting events established in 2005
Recurring sporting events established in 2017
2005 establishments in Argentina
2017 disestablishments in Uruguay